The 1996–97 Duke Blue Devils men's basketball team represented Duke University. The head coach was Mike Krzyzewski. The team played its home games in the Cameron Indoor Stadium in Durham, North Carolina, and was a member of the Atlantic Coast Conference.

Roster

Schedule

|-
!colspan=12 style=| Regular season

|-
!colspan=12 style=| ACC Tournament

|-
!colspan=12 style=| NCAA tournament

Rankings

Awards and honors
 Mike Krzyzewski, ACC Coach of the Year
 Mike Krzyzewski, Basketball Times National Coach of the Year

Team players drafted into the NBA
No one from the men's basketball team was selected in the 1997 NBA draft.

References

Duke
Duke
Duke Blue Devils men's basketball seasons
1996 in sports in North Carolina
1997 in sports in North Carolina